The 2021 Penn State Nittany Lions men's volleyball team represented Pennsylvania State University in the 2021 NCAA Division I & II men's volleyball season. The Nittany Lions, led by 27th-year head coach Mark Pavlik, played their home games at Rec Hall. The Nittany Lions were members of the Eastern Intercollegiate Volleyball Association and were picked to win the EIVA in the preseason poll. The Nittany Lions played mostly a conference schedule due to the COVID-19 pandemic. After winning the EIVA regular season and conference tournament titles the Nittany Lions qualified for the NCAA Tournament. After winning the opening round match the Nittany Lions fell in the semifinals to Lewis.

Roster

Schedule

 *-Indicates conference match.
 Times listed are Eastern Time Zone.

Broadcasters
Ohio State: No commentary
Ohio State: No commentary
Ohio State: Christopher Hess & Connor Griffin
Ohio State: Christopher Hess & Jack McHugh
St. Francis: Preston Shoemaker & Zach Donaldson
St. Francis: Josh Starr & Andrew Destin
NJIT: No commentary
NJIT: Joe Skinner & DJ Bauer
Sacred Heart: Corey Picard & Melissa Batie-Smoose
Sacred Heart: Brendan Picozzi & Melissa Batie-Smoose
George Mason: Jake Starr & Zech Lambert
George Mason: David Hadar & Trevor Grady
Charleston (WV): No commentary
Charleston (WV): Joe Skinner & Matt McLaughlin
NJIT: Ira Thor
NJIT: Ira Thor
Sacred Heart: Andrew Destin & Logan Bourandas
Sacred Heart: David Hadar & Matt Scalzo
George Mason: Brian McSweeney & Aylene Ilkson
George Mason: Brian McSweeney & Valerie Preactor
Charleston (WV): Jack Rivers
Charleston (WV): Jack Rivers
St. Francis: David Hadar & Jon Draeger
George Mason: Preston Shoemaker & Logan Bourandas 
Belmont Abbey: Luke Wood Maloney & Ben Spurlock
Lewis: Luke Wood Maloney & Ben Spurlock

Honors
To be filled in upon completion of the season.

References

2021 in sports in Pennsylvania
2021 NCAA Division I & II men's volleyball season
2021 team
Penn State